Growing Leg, Diminishing Skirt (Spanish:Pierna creciente, falda menguante) is a 1970 Spanish musical comedy film directed by Javier Aguirre and starring Laura Valenzuela, Fernando Fernán Gómez and Emma Cohen.

Cast 
 Laura Valenzuela as Guadalupe Cardoso 'Lupe'  
 Fernando Fernán Gómez as Amadeo - Duke of Daroca  
 Emma Cohen as Rosario 'La criollita'  
 Isabel Garcés as Doña Ramona  
 José Sacristán as Aníbal Trijueque 
 Manuel Gil as Raul - Marquess of Corbina 
 Enriqueta Carballeira 
 Elena María Tejeiro 
 Don Jaime de Mora y Aragón as Pepe Bierzo - Baron of Bierzo 
 Mayrata O'Wisiedo 
 Álvaro de Luna as Alberto García del Chaparral  
 Lola Gaos as Doña Úrsula  
 José Jaspe 
 Manuel Alexandre as Flirty gentleman
 Barta Barri 
 Blaki as Diego Ramírez  
 Pilar Gómez Ferrer as Mother of Rosario  
 Santiago Rivero 
 José Franco 
 Joaquín Pamplona 
 María Elena Arpón as Maid of Lupe  
 Azucena Molina 
 María Elena Flores 
 Beni Deus
 Adriano Domínguez 
 Manuel Díaz Velasco 
 Yolanda Ríos 
 Ketty de la Cámara 
 José García Calderón 
 Fabián Conde 
 José Manuel Cervino 
 Ramón Ferrer 
 Alejandro García 
 María Eugenia Calleja 
 Laly Soldevila as Rosa Ortega 'La Bella Orteguita' 
 Lone Fleming 
 María José Camores
 Manolo Gómez Bur as Man with diving helmet

References

Bibliography
 Mira, Alberto. The A to Z of Spanish Cinema. Rowman & Littlefield, 2010.

External links 

1970 films
1970s musical comedy films
Spanish musical comedy films
1970s Spanish-language films
1970 comedy films
1970s Spanish films